The 18th International Adana Golden Boll Film Festival was a film festival held in Adana, Turkey from September 17 to 25, 2011. Cash prizes totalling 936,000 Turkish Liras, the highest amount given by a film festival in Turkey, were awarded for all categories, for the first time in Turkey, in three competitive sections, nearly 220 films were shown both in and out of competition in a selection described by critic Ali Koca as "one of the event’s strongest  in recent years," following disappointment with the previous year's hastily rescheduled event, and there were also a range of lectures, workshops and other events, including the 1st International Golden Boll Film Congress, said to be the first to be organised during a film festival.

This edition of the International Adana Golden Boll Film Festival, which was founded in 1969 and is organised by the Adana Metropolitan City Municipality and accredited by FIPRESCI, was the first to accept digital submissions from filmmakers for its national feature competition. It began with an opening gala at the Merkez Park open-air theater on September 17 at which speeches were made by Adana Metropolitan City Municipality Deputy Head Zihni Aldırmaz and Development Minister Cevdet Yılmaz, Lifetime Achievement Awards were presented to Turkish actors Kadir İnanır and Nebahat Çehre, and Turkish filmmaker Ali Özgentürk, and a concert was given by the trio of Mazhar-Fuat-Özkan. Turkish actors and actresses Nuri Alço, Yavuz Karakaş, Yılmaz Köksal and Yusuf Sezgin were among those who toured the city in old style roadsters as part of the annual "Love Cortege" while the annual Solidarity Night for Cinema took place at Mimar Sinan Amphitheatre. The festival closed with an awards ceremony hosted by academic Özlem Gürses and actor Murat Başoğlu at the Adana Merkez Park Amphitheater.

The festival also played host to the 1st International Golden Boll Film Congress, coordinated by Dokuz Eylül University Faculty of Fine Arts Film Design Department and headed by Honorary Presidents Ö. Lütfi Akad, at the Adana Seyhan Hotel from September 21 to 24 on the theme of Turkish Cinema: Views from Turkey and the World, and the Adana Cinema Museum, also run by the Adana Metropolitan City Municipality, was officially opened in a restored historic mansion on Şeyhan Street.

Awards

Awards 
The festival's Best Actor award was dedicated in honour of Adana-born actor Cem Erman who died shortly before the start of the festival.

 Best Film: The Extremely Tragic Story of Celal Tan and His Family directed by Onur Ünlü
 Best Director: Cemil Ağacıkoğlu for September
 Best Screenplay: Onur Ünlü for The Extremely Tragic Story of Celal Tan and His Family 
 Best Actor: Durukan Ordu for Future Lasts Forever
 Best Supporting Actor: Tuna Orhan for A Serious Matter
 Best Actress: Hatice Aslan for The Body  and Görkem Yeltan  for September
 Best Supporting Actress: Şeyla Halis for The Body 
 Most Promising Newcomer (male): Hakan Kurtaş for The Body  and Gün Koper for Love and Revolution 
 Most Promising Newcomer (female): Deniz Denker for Love and Revolution 
 Best Editing: Taner Sarf   for September
 Best Art Director: Adalı Aksoy for Love and Revolution  and Hidden Lives 
 Jury Award for Best Ensemble Cast Performance: The Extremely Tragic Story of Celal Tan and His Family
 Best Music: Mustafa Biber for Future Lasts Forever
 Best Cinematography: Feza Çaldıran for Future Lasts Forever
 Best Sound Effects: Burak Topalakçı for Losers' Club  and September
 Special Jury Award: Love and Revolution directed by F. Serkan Acar
 Adana Audience Award: Simurg directed by Ruhi Karadağ
 Yılmaz Güney Award: Future Lasts Forever directed by Özcan Alper
 Turkish Film Critics Association (SİYAD) Best Film Award: Future Lasts Forever directed by Özcan Alper

Honorary Awards 
Three Lifetime Achievement Awards were presented at the opening ceremony.
 Lifetime Achievement Award: Kadir İnanır (Turkish actor) 
 Lifetime Achievement Award: Nebahat Çehre (Turkish actor)
 Lifetime Achievement Award: Ali Özgentürk (Turkish producer, director & screenwriter)
The festival also curated retrospectives of the recipients films and commissioned books from film critic Burçak Evren about their respective careers.

Competition Sections

National Feature Film Competition 
Fourteen Turkish films made in the preceding year were selected by the Pre-Evaluation Board to compete in the festival’s National Feature Film Competition.

National Feature Film Competition Jury 
Jury Head: Derviş Zaim (Turkish Cypriot director)
Beste Bereket (Turkish actress)
Bülent Vardar (Turkish author & academician)
Ebru Ceylan (Turkish screenwriter & actress)
Selim Demirdelen (Turkish director & screenwriter)
Taner Birsel (Turkish actor)
Yekta Kopan (Turkish author)

National Feature Film Competition Selection 
A Serious Matter directed by İsa Yıldız & Murat Onbul 
Future Lasts Forever directed by Özcan Alper
Hidden Lives directed by A. Haluk Ünal
Home directed by Muzatffer Özdemir
Losers' Club directed by Tolga Örnek
Love and Revolution directed by F. Serkan Acar
Love Me directed by Ali Özgentürk
September directed by Cemil Ağacıkoğlu
Simurg directed by Ruhi Karadağ
Snake directed by Caner Erzincan
The Body directed by Mustafa Nuri
The Extremely Tragic Story of Celal Tan and His Family directed by Onur Ünlü
Turkish Passport directed by Burak Cem Arlıel
Velvet / The Great Mother directed by Erdoğan Kar

National Student Films Competition 
Seven documentary films, seven animation films, ten experimental films, ten fictional films by undergraduate students studying at cinema and television departments of Turkey’s communications and fine arts faculties were selected from the 180 films that were submitted to compete in the festival’s National Student Films Competition.

Mediterranean Short Film Competition  
Twelve documentary films, eighteen animation films, fourteen experimental films and forty-two fictional films were selected from the 526 films from 25 countries that were submitted to compete in the festival’s Mediterranean Short Film Competition.

Screening Sections

Retrospective: Derviş Zaim 
Turkish Cypriot director Derviş Zaim, who headed the National Feature Film Competition Jury, received a retrospective of six of his works.

Dot
Elephants and Grass
Mud
Shadows and Faces
Somersault in a Coffin
Waiting for Heaven

Turkish Premiere: Once Upon a Time in Anatolia 
The director was in attendance for the Turkish premiere of his 2011 Cannes Film Festival Grand Prix-winning film, as well as an exhibition of his photographic works.

Once Upon a Time in Anatolia directed by Nuri Bilge Ceylan

World Cinema 
A selection of nine internationally acclaimed films, including the latest from American director Woody Allen.

Above Us Only Sky directed by Jan Schomburg
Amnesty directed by Bujar Alimani
Apnea directed by Ari Bafalouka
Karen Cries in a Bus directed by Gabriel Rojas Vera
Man without a Cell Phone directed by Sameh Zoab
Midnight in Paris directed by Woody Allen
Parked directed by Darragh Byrne
The House directed by Zuzana Liová
Tomorrow Will Be Better directed by Dorata Kedzierzawska

The Desert of the Real 
A selection of critically acclaimed documentaries were screened under the title "The Desert of the Real".

I am Asian, I am African 
Tunisian film critic Hassouna Mansouri and Lebanese director Bahij Hojeij were among the panel for the related discussion at the Metropolitan Municipality Theater Hall.

See also 
 2011 in film
 Turkish films of 2011

External links
  for the festival

References

2011 film festivals
Golden Boll
21st century in Adana